The 1943 Southwestern Louisiana Bulldogs football team was an American football team that represented the Southwestern Louisiana Institute of Liberal and Technical Learning (now known as the University of Louisiana at Lafayette) in the Louisiana Intercollegiate Conference during the 1943 college football season. The Bulldogs played their home games at McNaspy Stadium in Lafayette, Louisiana, and competed in the Louisiana Intercollegiate Conference, which saw no league play in 1943 because of World War II. They were led by second-year head coach Louis Whitman, compiled a record of 5–0–1, and outscored their opponents 172 to 40. In the Oil Bowl, the Bulldogs defeated Arkansas A&M on a muddy field, a team that had tied them 20–20 earlier in the season.

Schedule

References

Southwestern Louisiana
Louisiana Ragin' Cajuns football seasons
College football undefeated seasons
Southwestern Louisiana Bulldogs football